The Tarragon Theatre is a theatre in Toronto, Ontario, Canada, and one of the main centers for contemporary playwriting in the country. Located near Casa Loma, the theatre was founded by Bill and Jane Glassco in 1970. Bill Glassco was the artistic director from 1971 to 1982. In 1982, Urjo Kareda took over as artistic director and remained in that role until his death in December 2001. Richard Rose was appointed artistic director in July 2002, and Camilla Holland was appointed general manager in July 2006.

In 1987, Tarragon purchased and renovated the building that has been its home since 1971. There are two playing spaces: Mainspace (205 seats), The Extra Space (113 seats).

Tarragon is well known for its development, creation and encouragement of new work. Over 170 works have premiered at Tarragon. Playwrights who have premiered their work here include Morwyn Brebner, David French, Michael Healey, Joan MacLeod, Morris Panych, James Reaney, Jason Sherman, Brendan Gall, Hannah Moscovitch, Ellie Moon and Judith Thompson.

Background
The theatre is housed in a building originally designed for light industrial use—for instance, it was once a cribbage board factory.

It has championed the work of Canadian playwrights David French, Michel Tremblay, Judith Thompson, Jason Sherman, Michael Healey and others, as well as productions of plays by canonical playwrights such as Anton Chekhov and August Strindberg.

The theatre holds two performances venues, containing approximately 200 and 100 seats respectively. One of their rehearsal halls can also be used as a performance area, seating 60.

It remains one of the foremost organizations for producing new plays in Canada.

Artistic directors
Bill Glassco (1971–1982)
Urjo Kareda (1982–2002)
Richard Rose (2002–present)

2008-2009 season
Scorched - by Wajdi Mouawad
The Black Rider: The Casting of the Magic Bullets - by Robert Wilson, Tom Waits, and William S. Burroughs
Bashir Lazhar - by Évelyne de la Chenelière, translated by Morwyn Brebner
Moliere - by Sabina Berman
East of Berlin - by Hannah Moscovitch
Ubuntu - by The Ensemble
The Patient Hour - by Kristen Thomson
Another Home Invasion - by Joan MacLeod
A Beautiful View - by Daniel MacIvor
House of Many Tongues - by Jonathan Garfinkel

References

External links
 Tarragon Theatre web site
 Tarragon Theatre fonds (R10611) at Library and Archives Canada. The fonds consists of posters advertising productions staged at the Tarragon Theatre in Toronto in 1972 and 1973.

Theatre companies in Toronto
Theatres in Toronto
1970 establishments in Ontario